The University of Saint Katherine (USK) is a private, non-profit undergraduate and graduate university located in San Marcos, California. Founded by Frank J. Papatheofanis, MD, PhD, It opened in 2011, and has grown each year in enrollment from its inaugural class of 11 in 2011 to 275 in 2021. The university's mission is to provide a balanced education in the liberal arts and sciences, founded and rooted in the life of the Eastern Orthodox tradition – Inquiry Seeking Wisdom.

History

The University of Saint Katherine (USK) was founded by Frank J. Papatheofanis, MD, PhD and incorporated on June 30, 2010, as a California not-for-profit corporation. USK was formerly known as Saint Katherine College and was approved for name change in November 2016 by the  California Bureau for Private and Post-Secondary Education (BPPE). BPPE approved the university for operation in 2011, and when the Western Senior College and University Commission(WSCUC) granted accreditation in 2016, authority to issue degrees shifted to WSCUC purview. USK takes pride in being among the youngest institutions within the WSCUC portfolio of accredited colleges and universities.

The university was originally located in Encinitas, California from 2010 to 2014, and moved to San Marcos, California in August 2014. Since its founding, the university has offered baccalaureate degrees (BA, BS) in the liberal arts and sciences taught in the context of an Eastern Orthodox worldview. In 2020, it began to offer a Master of Arts (MA) in Organizational Leadership; in 2022, a Master of Science in Kinesiology and an online Master of Arts in Orthodox Theology were added. Classroom instruction began in September 2011.  The first commencement ceremony occurred in May  2013 and was marked by the graduation of one student. Since then, USK alumni have grown to over 150. USK is the only independent Eastern Orthodox higher education institution of liberal arts and sciences in the Western hemisphere.

For the 2016–2021 academic years, the University of St. Katherine was awarded an "A"-grade by the American Council of Trustees and Alumni for its emphasis on a comprehensive core curriculum.

Academic
The University of Saint Katherine (USK) teaches liberal arts and sciences. It is the first comprehensive university of liberal arts and sciences in the Orthodox Christian tradition.  Orthodox Christianity, founded at the original Pentecost, forms the basis for all Christian faith traditions. The university offers a distinctive set of undergraduate and graduate degree programs that reflect its mission in over 25 fields of study.

 Areas of study
Applied Biological Health Science - BS concentration,
Art – BA concentration or minor,
Biological Sciences – BS concentration,
Business Management – BA concentration or minor,
Chemistry & Biochemistry – BS concentration,
Communications & Public Relations – BA concentration,
Computer Science – BS concentration, 
Digital Marketing – BA concentration,
English Language and Literature – BA concentration or minor,
History – BA concentration or minor,
Human Resource Management- BA concentration
Interdisciplinary Studies – BA concentration or minor,
Kinesiology- Exercise Science & Athletic Performance – BS concentration or minor,
Kinesiology- Health Science – BS concentration or minor,
Music – BA concentration or minor,
Orthodox Christian Theology – BA concentration or minor,
Psychology – BA concentration or minor,
Public Health – BS concentration,
Supply Chain & Project Management – BA concentration,
Organizational Leadership - MA,
Organizational Leadership - Biotechnology - MA concentration,
Organizational Leadership - Wealth Management - MA concentration,
Kinesiology - MS,
Orthodox Christian Theology - MA,
Orthodox Christian Theology - Orthodox Ecumenical Theology - MA concentration.

Affiliated institutions 
The university maintains collaborative partnerships and articulation agreements with the Institute of Orthodox Christian Studies (Cambridge, UK), Point Loma Nazarene University (graduate school), and the University of San Diego (teaching credential qualification), as well as others.  These agreements with various universities are in place so students can continue seamlessly to graduate work elsewhere. A partnership with Lake Erie College of Medicine allows students to apply early and be guaranteed acceptance in medical, dental, or pharmacy school while completing undergraduate study at the University of Saint Katherine.

Distinctions
The university hosts a chapter of Omicron Delta Kappa national honor society. Students are inducted each year based on academic performance, leadership, and community engagement. A university graduate became its first Fulbright Award recipient in 2020. The University has published the Saint Katherine Review since 2011.

Athletics
The Saint Katherine (USK) athletic teams are called the Firebirds. The university was admitted as a member of the National Association of Intercollegiate Athletics (NAIA), primarily competing in the California Pacific Conference (Cal Pac) since the 2019–20 academic year. 

USK competes in 14 intercollegiate varsity sports: Men's sports include baseball, basketball, beach volleyball, cross country, soccer, tennis and volleyball; while women's sports include basketball, beach volleyball, cross country, soccer, softball, tennis and volleyball.

In 2020–21, all but two collegiate teams qualified for post-season championships. Also, in 2020-21, the men's basketball team made history by facing off against 10 NCAA Division I opponents.

Student body
Admissions
 
First-time Freshmen should demonstrate a high school GPA of 2.5 or above, with 3.0 and above eligible for consideration for the President's Scholarship. For Transfers, the same minimums apply, with a nearly automatic acceptance of AA holders from California Community Colleges through the Associate Degrees for Transfer (ADT) articulation agreement.

References

External links
 Official website
 Official athletics website

Eastern Orthodox universities and colleges
Education in San Marcos, California
Universities and colleges in San Diego County, California
Private universities and colleges in California
Educational institutions established in 2010
2010 establishments in California